The Happening is a 1967 American crime comedy film directed by Elliot Silverstein, and starring Anthony Quinn, Michael Parks, George Maharis, Robert Walker Jr., Martha Hyer, and Faye Dunaway. It tells the story of four hippies, who kidnap a retired Mafia mob boss, holding him for ransom.

The film is an anti-establishment story that questions the values of Middle America and the older generation.

Plot
Four bored beach bums from Miami come across kids playing with toy guns. They chase one of them into a house, which, by chance, belongs to one Roc Delmonico, a former gangster who is now retired from organized crime and has become a respectable businessman.

Delmonico assumes it to be a kidnapping and volunteers to go quietly. The hippies like the idea, particularly their leader, Taurus, a gigolo who lives off rich ladies. He and his accomplices, Sureshot, Herby and Sandy, drive off with Delmonico in the trunk of their car. They hide out and demand a ransom of $200,000.

No one, unfortunately, will pay the ransom—not Delmonico's unhappy wife, Monica, or his business partner, Fred, or even Sam, his old mob boss. The frustrated crooks decide that it is hopeless, but Delmonico is so offended that he personally takes charge of his own kidnapping. He raises the demand to $3 million, vowing to reveal secrets that will ruin Monica, Fred and Sam.

The money is paid, whereupon the greedy Taurus suggests to Delmonico that they kill the others, leaving a two-way split. However, Delmonico knows not only that the boy cannot be trusted, but also that the bank has marked the bills from the ransom and that the police will trace them. Delmonico sets fire to the money and walks away. When asked what he will do now, Delmonico responds, without looking back, "Who knows?"

Cast
 Anthony Quinn as Delmonico
 George Maharis as Taurus
 Michael Parks as Sureshot
 Robert Walker Jr. as Herby
 Martha Hyer as Monica
 Faye Dunaway as Sandy
 Jack Kruschen as the Inspector
 Oscar Homolka as Sam
 Milton Berle as Fred

Soundtrack

Only a minor success as a film, The Happening is most notable today both as one of Faye Dunaway's earliest films and for its self-titled theme song. Recorded by The Supremes, "The Happening" became a number-one hit on the Billboard Hot 100 when released as a single on the Motown label.

Another music piece, "The Fuzz", was used by several local area TV news programs in the United States and Canada in the late 1960s and early 1970s, and a rearrangement of the same composition is still used by Brazil's Rede Globo national newscast Jornal Nacional, and Televisa in Mexico for national newcast 24 Horas.

See also
 List of American films of 1967

External links
 
 

1967 films
1967 comedy films
1960s crime comedy films
1960s English-language films
American crime comedy films
Columbia Pictures films
Films scored by Frank De Vol
Films about kidnapping in the United States
Films directed by Elliot Silverstein
Films produced by Sam Spiegel
Films set in Miami
Films shot in Miami
Hippie films
Mafia comedy films
1960s American films
English-language crime comedy films